The Greater Lafayette Public Transportation Corporation (GLPTC) is a municipal corporation founded in 1971 that provides bus services in Tippecanoe County, Indiana under the operating name of CityBus.

History 
In 1970, the privately owned Greater Lafayette Bus Company abruptly ceased operations and the City of Lafayette hastily assumed operation of the bus routes. Since the routes operated in West Lafayette in addition to Lafayette, a funding mechanism that allowed the use of tax revenues from both cities was needed. GLPTC was formed to operate city bus services in the two cities and select surrounding areas of Tippecanoe County. GLPTC receives funding from the federal government, the State of Indiana and property taxes levied in the service areas. In 1998 GLPTC began using the operating name CityBus.

Current operations 
As with most transit agencies, CityBus saw a decrease in ridership in 2020 due to the COVID-19 pandemic, a small increase was observed in 2021. The corporation's revenue for 2021 was $14.03 million, with approximately $2.8 million coming from farebox collections, pass sales, charters and other services. As of August 2022, the CityBus fleet consists of 72 buses: 7 paratransit buses, 41 CNG buses, 20 hybrid diesel-electric buses, and 4 diesel buses. In 2021 CityBus (GLPTC) was the second busiest bus system in Indiana with more than 2.4 million rider trips.

CityBus has a partnership with Purdue University and Ivy Tech Community College that allows students, faculty and staff of these universities to ride free of cost.

CityBus is currently undergoing a replacement plan that will eventually replace all of their Diesel and Hybrid buses with CNG buses. As of August 2020, CityBus surpassed their goal of having 50% of their fleet use CNG fuel by 2025.

Routes 
CityBus operates 15 regular routes through Lafayette and West Lafayette, 3 contracted routes for apartment complexes, and an additional 4 routes within the Purdue University campus.

Current Fleet 
CityBus operates a fleet of transit and para-transit buses. A slight majority of its transit buses are New Flyers, but there are also a number of Gillig Low Floor / Gillig BRT buses. The para-transit buses, used for their "ACCESS" system, are mostly mini-buses based on the Ford E-Series chassis. In 2015, CityBus, along with other transportation providers, signed a 5-year contract with New Flyer to provide up to 159 new buses (total) for the providers. CityBus ordered buses 5001–5009, 6001–6006, and 7001-7006 through the consortium, for a total of 21 buses, fulfilling their portion of the contract.

Retired Fleet 
These buses have been retired from the CityBus fleet. Retired vehicles are typically auctioned off to the public, while some are used for spare parts prior to sale.

References

External links 
Website

Bus transportation in Indiana
Lafayette, Indiana
West Lafayette, Indiana
Transportation in Tippecanoe County, Indiana
Transit authorities with natural gas buses
1971 establishments in Indiana